Royner Grover Navarro Calle (born 1 August 1992) is a Peruvian road cyclist, who currently rides for Peruvian amateur team Ciclismo Extremo Peruano. He was selected to compete in the road race at the 2020 Summer Olympics.

Major results

2010
 National Junior Road Championships
1st  Road race
2nd Time trial
2012
 National Under-23 Road Championships
1st  Road race
2nd Time trial
2013
 National Under-23 Road Championships
1st  Road race
3rd Time trial
 1st Stage 2 Vuelta a Bolivia
 8th Road race, Pan American Under-23 Road Championships
2018
 2nd Road race, National Road Championships
 South American Games
7th Road race
8th Time trial
2019
 1st Overall Vuelta a Perú
 4th Road race, Pan American Road Championships
2020
 6th Overall Vuelta al Ecuador

References

External links

Peruvian male cyclists
Living people
People from Ayacucho
1992 births
Pan American Games competitors for Peru
Cyclists at the 2015 Pan American Games
Cyclists at the 2019 Pan American Games
Olympic cyclists of Peru
Cyclists at the 2020 Summer Olympics
21st-century Peruvian people